1998 at the Star Club is a live album by the Welsh rock band Man recorded 27 March 1998 at the Star Club in Oberhausen in West Germany. The recordings of the full gig were issued as double CD in summer 1998.

Track listing

Disc one
 "The Ride and the View" – 12:45
 "C'mon" – 26:22
 "Do It" – 9:42
 "(Something In My Heart  Says) No" – 6:20
 "Drivin Around" – 17:20

Disc two
 "Band Intro" – 2:01
 "Many Are Called But Few Get Up/The Storm" – 13:48
 "Bananas" – 16:05
 "Romain" – 5:36
 "Spunk Rock" – 22:33

Personnel
 Martin Ace – bass, tuba, vocals
 Micky Jones – guitar, vocals
 Deke Leonard – guitar, piano, vocals
 Bob Richards – drums
 Phil Ryan – keyboards

References

External links

1998 live albums
Man (band) live albums